The 1884 Washington Nationals were a baseball team belonging to the Union Association.  They were managed by Michael Scanlon and finished in seventh place with a record of 47–65.  Their home games were played at Capitol Grounds.  The Nationals folded with the rest of the Union Association when it was discontinued after 1884, its only season of operation.

This team is distinct from the other 1884 Washington Nationals franchise, a different team that played in the American Association the same year.

See also
1884 Washington Nationals (UA) season
Washington Nationals (disambiguation)
Washington Senators (disambiguation)
Washington Nationals current MLB team

References and external links
UA Washington Nationals at Baseball Reference

Union Association baseball teams
Defunct baseball teams in Washington, D.C.
Baseball teams disestablished in 1884
Baseball teams established in 1884